Omega Red is a fictional character appearing in American comic books published by Marvel Comics, most commonly in association with the X-Men. In 2009, Omega Red was ranked as IGN's 95th Greatest Comic Book Villain of All Time.

Publication history

Omega Red first appeared in X-Men #4 (vol. 2, January 1992), and was created by Jim Lee and John Byrne.

Fictional character biography
Little is known about the past of Arkady Gregorivich Rossovich except that he was a serial killer born in Soviet Russia. He was captured by the Interpol agent Sean Cassidy and turned over to the KGB, which wanted to experiment and attempt to create a supersoldier similar to Captain America. Omega Red is the result.

In another version of Omega Red's past, Arkady was a Soviet soldier stationed in a small Siberian town. He was a murderer; his crimes easily discoverable due to the town's small size and limited number of potential victims. He was caught by his fellow soldiers and summarily executed via a gunshot to the back of the head. His superiors are astonished when Arkady survives the execution, and recommend him for the aforementioned Soviet super soldier project, a brutal process; it is suggested that Arkady survives solely due to his evil and cruel nature. He becomes an operative for Soviet intelligence and the KGB.

The Soviet government implanted a retractable carbonadium tentacle within each of Omega Red's arms. Carbonadium was the Soviets' attempt to recreate the artificial alloy known as adamantium, as carbonadium is a more malleable form of adamantium. He uses them as weapons and as grappling appendages. He is able to wrap a victim in his coils to drain them of their "life" energy. This vampiric tendency is essential to Omega Red's survival; the carbonadium implants, while great offensive weapons, slowly poisoned him and he was required to regularly drain the life energy of a person, or perhaps take small amounts from larger numbers of individuals, in order to temporarily sustain his immune system. In order to stabilize his condition, Omega Red requires the "Carbonadium Synthesizer," a device that was stolen by Wolverine, Maverick, and Sabretooth during their final mission together as "Team X" and attempted rescue of double agent Janice Hollenbeck in the 1960s. It is because of his need for the Carbonadium Synthesizer that Omega Red has continuously sought out these three individuals over the years, believing they may know of its whereabouts. While Sabretooth and Maverick might have been aware of its location, it was eventually revealed that Wolverine actually does know where it is.

Omega Red also battled John Wraith in Berlin at that time.

At some time in the past, the Soviet government decided that Omega Red was too unpredictable and treacherous to be relied upon. As such, he needed to be put in cryogenic suspended animation until a method could be found to control him. After the fall of Communism in Russia he was revived from suspended animation by Matsu'o Tsurayaba, who led his own renegade faction of the clan of ninja known as The Hand. Omega Red became a warrior serving Matsu'o Tsurayaba and was led to believe that Wolverine knew the whereabouts of the Carbonadium Synthesizer which could save his life, and sought him out in an effort to find this device. In doing so, he came into conflict with the X-Men many times. In their first encounter in modern times, Omega Red captured Wolverine. He fought and defeated Wolverine, and brought him to Tsurayaba, Fenris, and Cornelius in Berlin. He battled the X-Men, and was wounded by Psylocke and defeated by the X-Men and Maverick but escaped. Later, Omega Red battled and fell under the mental control of the Soul Skinner in Siberia. The Soul Skinner then used him to battle Wolverine and the X-Men. Omega Red was able to subdue the team and capture Wolverine and Jubilee and was then sent to capture Colossus, who had retreated. Omega Red eluded capture by Wolverine after the Soul Skinner's death. He later fought against Chamber of Generation X, but suffered a humiliating defeat. Ultimately, Omega Red failed to eliminate Wolverine and proved to be no more loyal to the Hand than he was to the Soviet government.

He has worked for Neocommunist organizations and tried to kill a member of the Americomp organization, but was stopped by Daredevil and Black Widow.

Omega Red was later employed by Russian gangster Ivan Pushkin to incite a war between the terrorist organization HYDRA and the technology suppliers A. I. M.

While working for the drug lord known as the General, Omega Red was recruited by Sabretooth to attack Wolverine's friends and family alongside Lady Deathstrike. Sabretooth had promised both Omega Red and Deathstrike information on almost every mutant on Earth, but betrayed his new henchmen by teleporting away with Wolverine, his ward Amiko, and the information.

Omega Red is currently a crime lord (head of the Red Mafia) who poses as a legitimate business man, much like Wilson Fisk does in the U.S. At present, Omega Red has resumed his search for the Carbonadium Synthesizer. In Wolverine: Origins #6 and #7, Omega Red locates former Team X member, and now one of the numerous depowered mutants, Agent Zero a.k.a. Maverick, who is the only person that knows the location of the Carbonadium Synthesizer. This brings him into direct confrontation with Wolverine, who has also sought out Maverick in hopes of locating the Carbonadium Synthesizer. The result of this encounter is that Wolverine outsmarts Omega Red, landing him in the custody of S.H.I.E.L.D.

Months later, it becomes known that the Red Room bought Omega Red's freedom with the hopes of using him to their own ends. Wolverine, Colossus, and Nightcrawler encounter him after he has freed himself from his master, however, and they engage in combat. Omega Red is largely impervious to Wolverine's claws; the Red Room had been experimenting on his body in an effort to enhance his healing factor. After Nightcrawler intervenes and knocks Omega Red unconscious, he is returned to S.H.I.E.L.D. custody.

Thanks to the enigmatic Romulus, Omega Red is transferred to a regular Russian prison to set a trap for Wolverine. Aided by Wild Child, their plan consisted of dropping Logan into molten steel. However, as Wild Child was preparing to finish the job, Omega Red interrupted him. While Wild Child and Omega Red battle each other, Logan managed to flee. A distracted Wild Child is consequently thrown into the molten steel by Omega Red after having his chest punctured.

Omega Red was killed after being stabbed in the heart with the Muramasa blade by Wolverine.

Omega Red later appears in Hell attempting to attack Wolverine by binding him with his tentacles, but is quickly taken down when Wolverine grabs him by the tentacles and flips him over.

The body of Arkady Rossovich was later obtained by some Russian members of the Church of St. Mitrophan who, after a mystical ceremony made by their magiks, were able to raise Omega Red back to life. However, the procedure is only temporary, as the grave will continue to call Arkady, nevertheless they reassure him that they will continue searching for a way to overcome this limitation. The limitation was eventually solved when the Russian Mafia used the abilities of X-Man Magik to restore Omega Red to his fullest strength, but he was nevertheless defeated and delivered to the custody of S.I.C.K.L.E. (the Russian version of S.H.I.E.L.D.).

Arriving bloodied and beaten at Krakoa and seeking asylum, Omega Red is met by Wolverine, who tries to persuade Magneto that Arkady is too dangerous to be allowed on the island, as he poses too serious a threat to the women and children living there. Investigating his claims of a secret vampire enclave hidden in Paris, Wolverine is captured by Vlad Dracula, who has rejuvenated himself by drinking his blood. As per their agreement, Dracula presents Omega Red with the Carbonadium Synthesizer, warning him that it now contains a detonator, whereupon Arkady will serve as a spy in the service of Vlad to aid against any interference from the mutants towards the Vampire Nation's hidden agenda. At Wolverine's insistence, Omega Red is restrained by Krakoa and psychically interrogated by Jean Grey, whereupon X-Force discovers that Omega Red has indeed been mesmerized by Dracula to possibly serve as a spy for the Vampire Nation in exchange for the Carbonadium Synthesizer that is implanted within his chest. While Beast discusses with Forge about creating a duplicate C-Synth containing audio surveillance and homing beacon capabilities, we learn that the detonator has exploded, killing Omega Red. Resurrection protocols will involve delayed consciousness uploading after his new body has hatched insuring he has no memory of his death or rebirth, allowing him to serve X-Force as a double agent in his future dealings with Dracula.

Powers and abilities
Omega Red is a mutant with superhuman strength, stamina, durability, agility, and reflexes, and the ability to secrete pheromones from his body typically referred to as "Death Spores". The death spores result in the weakness or death of humans in his immediate vicinity. The severity of the effect is based on the endurance, health, and relative proximity of the victims. The spores are fatal to ordinary humans within seconds, though some superhumanly powered beings can withstand exposure to them for extended periods of time.

Implanted within Omega Red's arms are long retractable tendril-like coils made of carbonadium, an artificial alloy that is the former Soviet Union's attempt at creating true adamantium. Carbonadium is more malleable than adamantium and, while being vastly stronger than steel, is considerably less durable than adamantium. Carbonadium, however, is for all practical purposes virtually indestructible. Omega Red can cause the coils to shoot forward from openings in the undersides of his wrists in order to ensnare his victims. Omega Red is able to use the tentacles as highly effective offensive weapons, often brandishing them like whips during combat. The natural durability of the tentacles, combined with his physical strength, are sufficient to cause damage to most conventional materials.

Omega Red also has superhuman levels of stamina sufficient to engage Wolverine in combat continuously for over eighteen hours with no signs of fatigue. His bodily tissues are harder and more resistant to certain types of injury than those of an ordinary human. While he is not invulnerable, his body can withstand great impact and blunt trauma forces that would result in severe injury or death in an ordinary human. However, his resistance to injury is considerably enhanced due to the red carbonadium armor that he wears, which has been sufficient to allow him to withstand powerful energy blasts from the likes of Chamber, and Wolverine's claws, without sustaining injury.

Omega Red has the ability, and need, to drain the life force of victims with his pheromones in order to sustain his own. Omega Red can likewise ensnare his victims within his tentacles, and use the coils as a conduit for his lethal pheromones. Due to the mutant "death factor" and the presence of the carbonadium within his body, Omega Red must drain the life force of others on a regular basis in order to sustain his own physical health and remain active. Omega Red can use these absorbed energies to, temporarily, increase his body's healing capabilities to the point where he can fully heal from a punctured lung within a few minutes. Only a device known as the Carbonadium Synthesizer can stabilize his condition, as carbonadium is the only metal that can neutralize the "death factor," thereby stabilizing it within his body.

Omega Red is an excellent hand-to-hand combatant and military tactician. He was trained in various forms of armed and unarmed combat by both the Soviet government and various organizations throughout the Japanese and Russian criminal underworlds. Highly intelligent, he has quickly become highly skilled in the management of criminal organizations.

Omega Clan
Following the demise of Omega Red, a secret organization known as "The White Sky" which is specialized in growing and programming unique assassins to meet all their clients' expectations, were hired to create three "clones" from the remains of the original Omega Red. Each of these clones have different abilities from each other and they passionately hate X-Force just for the fact they were implanted with false memories to believe that X-Force members had killed their father.

The Omega Clan is composed by:

 Omega Black – A female clone of Omega Red, she goes by the programmed name of Sylvia Engel Rossovich. Omega Black's chest is implanted with five retractable Carbonadium tendrils which she can use to affect people with diseases, such as cancer.
 Omega White – A male clone of Omega Red, he has the power to create energy constructs similar to Omega Red's coils which he uses to drain the psychic energy and life force from his enemies. He's also able to render himself intangible, thus becoming immune to physical attacks.
 Omega Red – A male clone of Omega Red, in fact he is the closest member in terms of appearance and powers to the original Omega Red.

Confrontation with X-Force
When Wade Wilson tried to infiltrate the White Sky facility, he was discovered and battle the Omega Clan. He was quickly backed up by fellow X-Force members: Wolverine and Nightcrawler. Both of them were tortured by the three clones, until Deadpool managed to stop them by sending his own White Sky creation: Alpha Achromic.

Soon after that battle, the Omega Clan revealed itself as part of Daken's Brotherhood.

The whole Brotherhood hid for a time in an underwater secret base, in order to push Evan Sabahnur, Apocalypse's clone, into the Brotherhood's own Apocalypse.

When X-Force infiltrated the base, Omega Black was the one along Daken and Blob to stop Deadpool while he was trying to extract Evan. After being captured, Wade was inspected by Sylvia in order to remove his telepathic dampening device, and once Farouk had probed his mind, Omega Black was asked to kill Wade by filling his head with cancer.

Intent on doing what was asked of her, she tried to finish the job by beating him up with a wrench, only stopping when she was asked to bring Evan to see Wolverine drowning, in order to push him to wear the Celestial Armor and ascend as Apocalypse. As Daken was beating him to death to make him reveal his nature as Wolverine, Omega Black stopped him and brought the boy back to the torture room with Deadpool, and then left, while Evan wore the Celestial Armor to end this.

With the Celestial Armor on, Evan fought back and freed his friends, seemingly killing Omega Red in the process. Omega White tried to avenge his "brother" but Psylocke mind-controlled him in order to absorb the Shadow King's, and then erased Omega White's mind, leaving the Shadow King trapped in a brain-dead corpse. With the Brotherhood tore apart Black Omega was somehow able to escape the base. Omega White's body was later entrusted to Brian Braddock's care.

Subsequent whereabouts
It was revealed that Omega Red was able to survive Evan's attack and started a mercenary career, working for Roxxon. When he clashed with Deadpool, he tried to have revenge on him for the false memories implanted on him. After clashing with Deadpool numerous times, the mercenary convinced him that the memories of his past were false, and that just like him, Omega Red needed to realize he wouldn't be controlled by those who transformed them into monsters. Both called a truce, and Omega Red left Deadpool alone, unless he discovered he had actually murdered his family.

Omega Black has since reappeared too, with the revelation that she had become a vessel for Shadow King which the Crimson Pirates were supposed to give to Tullamore Voge.

In the "Return of Wolverine" mini-series, Omega Red appeared as a masked sniper at a work camp owned by Soteira. A revived Wolverine sees him shooting a fleeing scientist. Upon Wolverine returning fire, Omega Red shoots out the front tire of Wolverine's motorcycle. While on the ocean, Omega Red and a revived Daken attack the speedboat that Wolverine and Ana are on. Omega Red is shot off the boat by Ana using the speedboat's harpoon gun.

Reception
 In 2018, CBR.com ranked Omega Red 17th in their "Age Of Apocalypse: The 30 Strongest Characters In Marvel's Coolest Alternate World" list.

Other versions

Age of Apocalypse
In the "Age of Apocalypse" timeline, there is a different version of Omega Red known only as Rossovich. Instead of a homicidal maniac, Rossovich appeared more sane and business-like. He had ties to the mutant underground and the black market. He ended up face-to-face with Domino and Grizzly, who appeared to take his life when he couldn't provide them with the information they needed.

After the death of Apocalypse and the ascension of Weapon X into Weapon Omega, the heir of Apocalypse, it was mentioned that Rossovich had, in fact, survived and had returned to his country where under the alias of Omega Red had built an army strong enough to overrun most of Asia and Eastern Europe with relative ease. When Weapon Omega was eventually deposed, the threat from Omega Red to the East was expected, yet the first wave never came and it never would, as Omega Red had been given the knowledge that the canister containing the Apocalypse power was now in Prophet's possession.

Days of Future Now
In the "Days of Future Now" story, Omega Red is a member of X-Force.

Ultimate Marvel
In the Ultimate Marvel Universe, Omega Red is an enemy of Spider-Man. He is depicted as a mutant with a hatred of humans. At some point, he had been hired to attack a cargo ship belonging to Roxxon Industries as a conspiracy against its leader Donald Roxxon. After his fight with Spider-Man, he was arrested by S.H.I.E.L.D. However, he managed to escape when the Green Goblin escaped. His defeat by Spider-Man became public knowledge because of articles written by J. Jonah Jameson detailing his humiliation. Subsequently, his former clients blacklisted him. He blamed Jameson for the loss of his livelihood. When Jameson began writing articles critical of Roxxon, Omega Red went to the Daily Bugle office disguised as a janitor and ambushed Jameson in his office with the intent to do Roxxon a high-profile favor and restore his mercenary career. Unfortunately, Peter Parker happened to be in the Bugle office that day. Changing into his Spider-Man costume and bursting through Jameson's office window, he quickly subdued Omega Red, ultimately knocking him unconscious with a vending machine. His tentacles extend from the tops of his wrists instead of the bottom and appear to be organic, not artificial. He has demonstrated superhuman strength. He is later imprisoned in S.H.I.E.L.D.'s Triskelion, and freed in a breakout by Electro hired by Norman Osborn along with Kraven, and Gwen Stacy, a.k.a. Carnage.

Several months later after the death of Spider-Man, Omega Red is seen resuming his work but is stopped by the second Spider-Man.

In other media

Television
 Omega Red appears in X-Men: The Animated Series, voiced by Len Doncheff. This version is a Soviet patriot who claims his armor and tentacles are made of carbonadium. In his most notable appearances in the episodes "Red Dawn" and "A Deal with the Devil", he fights to restore the Soviet Union and destroy several world capitals via nuclear warheads from a defunct Soviet submarine, only to be thwarted by the X-Men and left trapped in the aforementioned submarine.
 Omega Red appears in the X-Men: Evolution episode "Target X", voiced by Richard Newman. This version is formerly a member of the Weapon X program and currently a HYDRA operative who seeks revenge on Wolverine, only to be eventually arrested by S.H.I.E.L.D.
 Omega Red appears in Marvel Anime: Wolverine, voiced by Ryuzaburo Otomo in the Japanese version and by JB Blanc in the English dub.

Film
 Omega Red has appears in Hulk Vs Wolverine, voiced by Colin Murdock. This version works for Weapon X's Team X.
 Omega Red makes a cameo appearance in Deadpool 2, portrayed by Dakoda Shepley. This version is a prisoner of a mutant prison called the Ice Box.
 An Omega Red film was in development at 20th Century Fox before it was cancelled.

Video games
 Omega Red appears in X-Men: Mutant Apocalypse as a Danger Room simulation.
 Omega Red appears as a playable character in X-Men: Children of the Atom, voiced by George Buza. 
 Omega Red appears as a playable character in Marvel Super Heroes vs. Street Fighter, voiced again by Len Doncheff.
 Omega Red appears as a playable character in Marvel vs. Capcom 2: New Age of Heroes, voiced again by Len Doncheff.
 Omega Red appears as a boss in X-Men Legends II: Rise of Apocalypse voiced by Steven Blum. This version works for Mikhail Rasputin and Apocalypse.
 Omega Red appears as a boss in the Game Boy Advance version of X2: Wolverine's Revenge.

References

External links
 Omega Red at Marvel.com

Characters created by Jim Lee
Characters created by John Byrne (comics)
Comics characters introduced in 1992
Fictional assassins in comics
Fictional characters with absorption or parasitic abilities
Fictional characters with superhuman durability or invulnerability
Fictional cryonically preserved characters in comics
Fictional flexible weapons practitioners 
Fictional Russian people
Fictional serial killers
Fictional Soviet people
Fictional whip users
Marvel Comics characters with accelerated healing
Marvel Comics characters with superhuman strength
Marvel Comics cyborgs
Marvel Comics male supervillains
Marvel Comics martial artists
Marvel Comics mutants
Wolverine (comics) characters
X-Men supporting characters